The Fifty-First Wisconsin Legislature convened from  to  in regular session. During this term, legislative business was largely held in the north wing of the Wisconsin State Capitol, which was the only part of the capitol to remain intact after the 1904 fire.

This was the first legislative session after the redistricting of the Senate and Assembly according to an act of the previous session.

Senators representing even-numbered districts were newly elected for this session and were serving the first two years of a four-year term. Assembly members were elected to a two-year term. Assembly members and even-numbered senators were elected in the general election of November 5, 1912. Senators representing odd-numbered districts were serving the third and fourth year of a four-year term, having been elected in the general election of November 8, 1910.

Major events
 March 4, 1913: Inauguration of Woodrow Wilson as the 28th President of the United States
 November 6–11, 1913: The Great Lakes Storm of 1913 resulted in more than 250 deaths and the destruction of 19 ships.
 December 23, 1913: President Woodrow Wilson signed the Federal Reserve Act into law, creating the Federal Reserve System.
 January 7, 1914: First ship to transit the completed Panama Canal.
 April 21, 1914: The United States began an occupation of Veracruz, Mexico, in response to the Tampico Affair, leading to a break in diplomatic relations.
 June 28, 1914: Archduke Franz Ferdinand of Austria, heir-presumptive to the throne of Austria-Hungary, was assassinated in Sarajevo by Serbian nationalist Gavrilo Princip.  The Austrian response would initiate the July Crisis.
 July 28, 1914: Austria-Hungary declared war on the Kingdom of Serbia, initiating World War I.
 July 30, 1914: The Russian Empire announced a general mobilization in support of Serbia.  This quickly resulted in the general mobilization of Austria-Hungary and their ally the German Empire.
 August 1, 1914: Germany declared war on Russia.
 August 3, 1914: Germany declared war on France.
 August 4, 1914: 
 The German Army began the invasion of Belgium.
 The United Kingdom declared war on Germany.
 August 20, 1914: Pope Pius X died at the Apostolic Palace after a brief illness.
 September 3, 1914: Giacomo della Chiesa was elected the 258th pope, taking the name Benedict XV.
 September 5–12, 1914: The First Battle of the Marne occurred near Brasles in northern France.  A victory for England and France, it halted the German offensive toward Paris.  Nearly 2,000,000 men participated in the battle, resulting in almost 500,000 casualties.
 September 26, 1914: President Woodrow Wilson signed the Federal Trade Commission Act of 1914.
 October 29, 1914: The Ottoman Empire launched a surprise attack against Russian ports on the Black Sea, resulting in a declaration of war by Russia and its allies France and England.
 November 3, 1914: 1914 U.S. general election:
 Emanuel L. Philipp elected Governor of Wisconsin.
 Paul O. Husting was elected U.S. senator from Wisconsin—the first by popular election.
 Wisconsin voters rejected ten different amendments to the state constitution:
 to allow petition-initiated referenda to bypass the legislature
 to increase legislative salary
 to allow the legislature to decrease the number of judicial circuits
 to establish state annuity insurance
 home rule for cities and villages
 municipal power of condemnation
 to create a fast track for future constitutional amendments—a 3/5 vote of the legislature in favor of a constitutional amendment would remove the need for a second vote by the subsequent legislature.
 to allow petition-initiated amendments to the state constitution
 to allow recall of state officers
 December 17, 1914: President Woodrow Wilson signed the Harrison Narcotics Tax Act.

Major legislation
 February 18, 1913: Joint Resolution ratifying an amendment to the constitution fo the United States relating to popular election of United States Senators, 1913 Joint Resolution 5.  This was Wisconsin's ratification of the seventeenth amendment to the United States Constitution.

Party summary

Senate summary

Assembly summary

Sessions
 1st Regular session: January 8, 1913August 9, 1913

Leaders

Senate leadership
 President of the Senate: Thomas Morris (R)
 President pro tempore: Harry C. Martin (R–Darlington)

Assembly leadership
 Speaker of the Assembly: Merlin Hull (R–Black River Falls)

Members

Members of the Senate
Members of the Senate for the Fifty-First Wisconsin Legislature:

Members of the Assembly
Members of the Assembly for the Fifty-First Wisconsin Legislature:

Changes from the 50th Legislature
New districts for the 51st Legislature were defined in 1911 Wisconsin Act 661, passed into law in the 50th Wisconsin Legislature.

Senate redistricting

Summary of changes
 11 districts were left unchanged 
 Dodge County went from having its own district to sharing with Washington County (13).
 Milwaukee County went from having 5 districts to 6 (4, 5, 6, 7, 8, 9).
 Rock County went from having its own district to sharing again with Walworth County (22).
 Only two single-county districts remain (19, 26).

Senate districts

Assembly redistricting

Summary of changes
 Bayfield County became its own district after previously having been in a shared district with Sawyer and Washburn counties.
 Eau Claire County went from having 2 districts to 1.
 Langlade County became its own district after previously having been in a shared district with Florence and Forest counties.
 Marinette County went from having 2 districts to 1.
 Milwaukee County went from having 16 districts to 19.
 Polk County became its own district after previously having been in a shared district with Burnett County.
 Price and Taylor counties both became independent districts after previously having been in a shared district.
 Rock County went from having 3 districts to 2.
 Sauk County went from having 2 districts to 1.
 Waupaca County went from having 2 districts to 1.

Assembly districts

Notes

References

External links
 1913: Related Documents from Wisconsin Legislature

1913 in Wisconsin
1914 in Wisconsin
Wisconsin
Wisconsin legislative sessions